Astghik Safaryan is an Armenian pop-rock singer and songwriter, and an economist.

Biography 
Astghik Safaryan is an Armenian Pop-rock singer and Songwriter, and an Economist,  born in 1986, 3 September in a Family of creative parents. Father – Poet, later Businessman  and Mather – former Singer. 

Astghik graduated Yerevan State University in Armenia, and by continuing her study in Barcelona she obtained 3 Master Diplomas with high degrees in 3 of Barcelona’s top Universities. 

Astghik started her musical path, taking her first steps by participating in ‘’POP- Idols" international contest in Armenia back in 2006. Now she is one of the leading Female artists in Armenian Music Industry who is the author of all of her songs /both music and lyrics/, and the producer of all her Discography and Videography. The Armenian Queen of POP-ROCK, as the press and magazines love to name her is also considered as an Armenian Fashion Icon for the young generation, as she is the stylist of all her images, in all her videos, photoshoots, etc.,  meanwhile establishing her Fashion Accessory line "ACO by Astghik Safaryan" in 2014.

Discography 

2009 – 1st CD Record- Album – "The Music Has Found Me" /album written & produced by Astghik Safaryan/

2010 – 2nd CD Record-Album – "In My Own Way" /Album totally written & produced by Astghik Safaryan/

2016 – 3rd CD Record-Album – "BETTER WAY" / Album totally written & produced by Astghik Safaryan/

2021 - 4th CD Record Album - "Di Ujegh es" (You are Strong) - / Album totally written & produced by Astghik Safaryan/

Videography
2008 – debut music video – "Meghavor es"

2009 – "Fabulous Boy"

2010 – "Mi Patuhan" ( shoot in Madrid, Spain)

2011 – "Sev Aknoc" (shoot in Madrid, Spain)

2012 – "NA" (shoot in Barcelona, Spain)

2013 – "Better Way" (shoot in Costa Brava, Spain )

2013 – "USH E"

2014 – "Today"

2015 – "SHALOM"

2016 – "Vorbuk"

2016 – "LAVN ES"

2017 - "Standard"

2018 - "Alone"

2018 - "Du Ujegh es" (shoot in Paris, France)

2018 - "O Qami Qami"

2019 - "Suerte" ( shoot in Costa Brava, Catalunya )

2020 - "Inchu"

2021  - "Hayastan"

2016- "Qami Pchir-2" (All Stars project)

2017 - "Ser Taracel"  (All Stars project) (music/lyrics by Astghik Safaryan )

Awards

2007 – ‘BEST NEW ACT’ by Armenian top Radio Competition "Voske Qnar"

2009 – "BEST MODERN FEMALE ARTIST" by Modern Music Awards

2009 – "BEST FEMALE ARTIST" by Armenian Music Television

2010 – "Artist bringing FRESHNESS" by Armenian top "YES" magazine-awards

2013 – "Armenian POP-ROCK Princess" by "WOW" Magazine-award

2015 – "Audience Sympathy" Award in "Porque Tu lo Vales" Spanish contest-award in Barcelona, Spain

2015 – "Armenian FASHION ICON" by Armenian top Style-Magazine "EL STYLE"

2015 - Covered Armenian top fashion magazine "EL- Style"

2016 - Covered Armenian top fashion Magazine "EL"

Concerts 
During her 15 years on stage Astghik had lots of concerts in Armenian Capital Yerevan and in Armenian regions . Back in 2016 along with Armenian rapper/R&B artist Narek Mets they took a university-Tour and had lots of concerts in Every Armenian University .

In 2017 in Moscow city there was held the Fashion Show of her Fashion brand "Aco" , during which she performed live on the defile stage along with the catwalk-models, and this style later became a ritual for every "Aco" Fashion Show . In 2017 she managed a tour on Ukrainian 4-cities singing for Armenian Communities.

Also Had plenty of Concerts for Armenian diaspora in European area, in some of European cities such as Paris, Barcelona, Brussels, also in Sweden, Dubai Etc.

References

1986 births
Living people
Musicians from Yerevan
21st-century Armenian women singers
Armenian pop singers